Karole is a given name. Notable people with the name include:

Karole Armitage (born 1954), American dancer and choreographer
Karole Rocher (born 1974), French actress
Karole Vail (born 1959), American museum director, curator, and writer

See also

Karol (name)
Karola
Karolj